is a retired Japanese football player who last played for Albirex Niigata. He played for Japan national team.

Club career
When he was at Shūyō Junior High School, he represented Yamaguchi Prefecture with future international teammate Seiichiro Maki. He went on to football powerhouse Teikyo High School. While at Teikyo, Tanaka was chosen as one of the Designated Players for Development by J.League and JFA. Because of this status, he was able to register as a FC Tokyo player while he was still eligible to play for his high school club.

After graduating Teikyo, he joined Urawa Reds. His first league appearance came on 29 April 2001 against Kashima Antlers. His first professional goal came on 21 May 2001 against Tokyo Verdy. He played many matches as forward from 2001 season. In 2003, Reds won the champions in J.League Cup. He was selected MVP award and New Hero award. However he suffered for repeated injuries from late 2005 while the club won many title, 2005 Emperor's Cup, 2006 J1 League, 2006 Emperor's Cup and 2007 AFC Champions League. In 2012, he could not play many matches and let the club end of 2012 season.

In 2013, Tanaka signed with Albirex Niigata. He played 32 matches in 2013 season, the most in his career. Although he played many matches every season, Albirex was relegated to J2 League end of 2017 season.

After nine years in Niigata, Tanaka officially retired on December 5th, 2021, when he left the pitch after 40 minutes into the home match against Machida Zelvia. Tanaka immediately joined Niigata's coaching staff for the youth sector.

National team career
Tanaka represented Japan at several underage levels. He was part of the Japanese 2004 Olympic football team eliminated in the first round after finishing fourth in group B, below group winners Paraguay, Italy, and Ghana.

He made his international debut on 31 July 2005 in an East Asian Championship against North Korea when he replaced Keiji Tamada in the 67th minute. He scored his first international goal on 3 August 2005 against China in the same tournament. His most recent goal came against Qatar on 19 November 2008. He played 16 games and scored 3 goals for Japan until 2009.

Club statistics
Updated to January 1st, 2022.

1Includes AFC Champions League and A3 Champions Cup.
2Includes J.League Championship and Japanese Super Cup.

National team statistics

Awards and honours

Club
Urawa Red Diamonds
J1 League (1): 2006
Emperor's Cup (2): 2005, 2006
J.League Cup (1): 2003
AFC Champions League (1): 2007
Japanese Super Cup (1): 2006

Individual
J.League Cup MVP (1): 2003
J.League Cup New Hero Award (1): 2003

References

External links
 
 
 Japan National Football Team Database
 
 Tatsuya Tanaka – Yahoo! Japan sports 

1982 births
Living people
Association football people from Yamaguchi Prefecture
Japanese footballers
Japan international footballers
J1 League players
J2 League players
Urawa Red Diamonds players
Albirex Niigata players
Olympic footballers of Japan
Footballers at the 2004 Summer Olympics
Asian Games medalists in football
Footballers at the 2002 Asian Games
Asian Games silver medalists for Japan
Association football forwards
Medalists at the 2002 Asian Games